Palacanthilhiopsis is a genus of very small or minute freshwater snails with an operculum, aquatic gastropod mollusks in the family Moitessieriidae.

Species
Species within the genus Palacanthilhiopsis include:
 Palacanthilhiopsis carolinae Girardi, 2009
 Palacanthilhiopsis kuiperi Girardi, 2009
 Palacanthilhiopsis margritae Boeters & Falkner, 2003
 Palacanthilhiopsis vervierii Bernasconi, 1988

References

 Nomenclator Zoologicus info

 
Moitessieriidae
Taxonomy articles created by Polbot